Myntra is a major Indian fashion e-commerce company headquartered in Bengaluru, Karnataka, India. The company was founded in 2007-2008 to sell personalized gift items. In May 2014, Myntra.com was acquired by Flipkart.

In May 2022, Myntra launched an express delivery service on its app to offer one of a kind of experience by fashion & beauty platform. This service allow shoppers to receive their orders for products marked with ‘M-express tag’ on the listing page within 24–48 hours of purchase.

History
Established by  Mukesh Bansal along with Ashutosh Lawania and Vineet Saxena; Myntra sold on-demand personalized gift items. It mainly operated on the B2B (business-to-business) model during its initial years. Between 2007 and 2010, the site allowed customers to personalize products such as T-shirts, mugs, mouse pads, and others.

In 2011, Myntra began selling fashion and lifestyle products and moved away from personalisation. By 2012 Myntra offered products from 350 Indian and International brands. The website launched the brands Fastrack Watches and Being Human.

The purchase was influenced by two large common shareholders Tiger Global and Accel Partners. Myntra functions and operates independently. Myntra continues to operate as a standalone brand under Flipkart ownership, focusing primarily on "fashion-conscious" consumers.

In 2014, Myntra's portfolio included about 1,50,000 products of over 1000 brands, with a distribution area of around 9000 pincodes in India. In 2015, Ananth Narayanan became the chief executive officer of Myntra.

On 10 May 2015, Myntra announced that it would shut down its website, and serve customers exclusively through its mobile app beginning 15 May. The service had already discontinued its mobile website in favour of the app. Myntra justified its decision by stating that 95% of traffic on its website came via mobile devices, and that 70% of its purchases were performed on smartphones. The move received mixed reception, and resulted in a 10% decline in sales. In February 2016, acknowledging the failure of the "app-only" model, Myntra announced that it would revive its website.

In September 2017, Myntra negotiated the rights to manage Esprit Holdings's 15 offline stores in India.
Myntra reported a net loss of ₹151.20 crore in the financial year 2017–2018.

In January 2021, Myntra changed its logo, after a police complaint was registered that the logo  resembles a naked woman. The complaint was filed by a woman named Naaz Patel, who runs an NGO called Avesta Foundation.

Acquisitions and investments
In October 2007, Myntra received its initial funding from Erasmic Venture Fund (now known as Accel Partners), Sasha Mirchandani from Mumbai Angels and a few other investors. In November 2008, Myntra raised almost $5 million from NEA-IndoUS Ventures, IDG Ventures and Accel Partners.
Myntra raised $14 million in a Series B round of funding. This round of investment was led by Tiger Global, a private equity firm; the existing investors IDG Ventures and Indo-US Venture Partners also put in substantial amount towards funding Myntra. Towards the end of 2011, Myntra.com raised $20 million in its third round of funding, again led by Tiger Global. In February 2014, Myntra raised additional $50 Million (Rs.310 crore) funding from Premji Invest and few other Private Investors.

In April 2015, Myntra acquired Bengaluru-based mobile app development platform company Native5, with a view to strengthen and expand Myntra's mobile technology team.

In July 2016, Myntra acquired mobile-based content aggregation platform Cubeit, to strengthen and expand its technology team.

In July, 2016 Myntra acquired their rival Jabong.com to become India's largest fashion platform. In October 2017, Myntra partnered with Ministry of Textiles to promote handloom industry.

In April 2017, the company acquired InLogg, a city-based technology platform for the e-commerce sector.

In April 2018, Myntra acquired Bengaluru-based start-up Witworks, a maker of wearable devices to strengthen its technology team.

In August 2018, Myntra acquired Mumbai-Based start-up Pretr Online Services Pvt. Ltd., an end-to-end omnichannel platform for retail.

Digital Reality Show (fashion influencer) 

Launched its first digital reality-based show "Myntra Fashion Superstar" which is based on the fashion influencer talent hunt on Myntra app on 17 September 2019. In association with Zoom Studios, his show will identify & reward India's next big fashion influencer. Show has eight episodes of reality serious which will see 10 contenders competing with each other. They would also be mentored and judged by a star studded jury, from the world of Bollywood, TV and fashion, including Bollywood actor Sonakshi Sinha and stylist Shaleena Nathani.

Regulatory action and lawsuits 
The Enforcement Directorate are investigating Myntra for breach of Foreign Exchange Management Act.

In January 2016, Enforcement Directorate issued notice to Myntra's owner Flipkart. It has a tie up with Nike with the dealer Funfash to sell all authentic Nike accessories

Labour issues 
In June 2016, Myntra's logistics staff went on a strike alleging lack of basic employee benefits and poor wages.

See also 
 E-commerce in India
 Online shopping
Flipkart

References

Indian companies established in 2007
Companies based in Bangalore
Online clothing retailers of India
Flipkart acquisitions
2007 establishments in Karnataka